John Holdsworth may refer to:
 John Holdsworth (referee), rugby league referee
 John Holdsworth (priest), Anglican archdeacon
 John Holdsworth (rugby union), Australian rugby union player